Bridges to Burn is an album by American sludge metal band 16. It was released January 20, 2009 through Relapse Records.

Overview 
Bridges to Burn is the fifth studio album released by 16, released in the United States on the band's 16th anniversary on January 20, 2009. The album also marked the first official release of new music from the band in seven years. It was the follow-up to 2002's Zoloft Smile. 

The band released the song "Skin and Bones" as the first preview track to their official MySpace page which was soon followed by the tracks "So Broken Down" and "Man Interrupted". Soon after the official release date, the band streamed the album in its entirety at BridgesToBurn.com. The artwork was done by Florian Bertmer.

Track listing 
All songs written and arranged by 16.

Personnel 
 Cris Jerue – vocals
 Bobby Ferry – guitar
 Tony Baumeister – bass
 Mateo Pinkerton – drums

Production 
 Produced by 16
 Engineered and mixed by Jeff Forrest
 Mastered by Scott Hull

References

External links 
Official Relapse Records website

2009 albums
Relapse Records albums
16 (band) albums